Isidor Ascheim (1891-1968) was a German-born Israeli painter and printmaker.

Biography
Isidor Ascheim was born in Margonin (present-day Poland) in 1891. He was raised in an Orthodox Jewish family and served during World War I. In 1919-23, Ascheim studied under the German Expressionist Otto Mueller in Breslau and was influenced by Erich Heckel of the Die Brücke (The Bridge) group. He immigrated to Mandate Palestine in 1940 and settled in Jerusalem. He was married to the Israeli painter Margot Lange-Ascheim.

Artistic career
He taught at the Bezalel School of Art and served as its director for several years. Ascheim's art is based on a direct impression of nature, life and the human form. His oeuvre represents a continuous connection with nature and the human figure, usually executed with a dark palette, the legacy of his German Expressionist roots.

Awards and recognition
In 1953, Ascheim was a co-recipient of the Dizengoff Prize for Painting.
In 1955, he received the Jerusalem Prize for Art.
In 1956, he participated in the Venice Biennale.

Selected collections
 Fine Arts Museum of San Francisco
 Israel Museum, Jerusalem

References

Further reading
 Isidor Aschheim: Drawings & Prints [Izidor Ashhaim: rishumim ve-hedpesim]. Jerusalem: Israel Museum, 1966.
 Talpir, Gabriel. 100 Artists in Israel. Tel-Aviv: Gazith Art Publishing, 1971.

External links
 
 Artnet.com (Isidor Aschheim)

1891 births
1968 deaths
People from Margonin
People from the Province of Posen
German military personnel of World War I
Jewish emigrants from Nazi Germany to Mandatory Palestine
Jewish painters
Israeli male painters
Academic staff of Bezalel Academy of Arts and Design
20th-century German painters
20th-century Israeli male artists
German male painters